Argyroptocha is a genus of moths belonging to the subfamily Olethreutinae of the family Tortricidae.

Species
Argyroptocha phalaenopa Diakonoff, 1968

See also
List of Tortricidae genera

References

External links
Tortricid.net

Tortricidae genera
Monotypic moth genera
Olethreutinae